The Horizon Apartments, also short The Horizon, is a residential high rise building in Darlinghurst, a suburb in the inner-city of Sydney, NSW, Australia. It is located on at 184 Forbes Street between Liverpool and William Streets. The controversial highrise was completed in 1998. Controversy stems from the height of the building and the shadowing effects on surrounding buildings. It has and has had many celebrity residents, such as Charlotte Dawson, Harry M. Miller, David Walsh, Jacki Weaver and Joh Bailey.

Design
The building features 260 apartments
It has a distinctive scalloped facade, and is finished in rendered concrete.

The design allowed for larger apartments in the top quarter, with balconies facing east towards the Pacific Ocean to maximise views. The location and shape of the building has also been chosen to benefit views of the Sydney Opera House and Harbour Bridge.

References

External links
 Opinion: Sydney Morning Herald
 Building info at skyscraperpage.com

Harry Seidler buildings
Residential skyscrapers in Australia
Skyscrapers in Sydney
Residential buildings completed in 1998
Apartment buildings in Sydney
Modernist architecture in Australia
Darlinghurst, New South Wales